Gulian may refer to:

Gulian, Heilongjiang, a town in Mohe, Heilongjiang Province, China
Gulian Airport
Gulian C. Verplanck (1786-1870), American politician
Gulian Verplanck (speaker) (1751-1799), American politician
Mount Gulian, a manor house in New York

See also
Golian (disambiguation)
Guliana (disambiguation)
Giuliani, a surname